"The One I Love" is a popular song.

The music was written by Bronisław Kaper and Walter Jurmann, the lyrics by Gus Kahn. The song was published in 1937, and appeared in the 1938 film Everybody Sing, starring Allan Jones, Judy Garland, and Fanny Brice.  In the film the song was sung by Allan Jones and reprised by Jones and Lynne Carver.

References

External links

 "The One I Love" at Classic Movie Musicals
 Everybody Sing at the Judy Garland Database

Songs with music by Bronisław Kaper
Songs with music by Walter Jurmann
Songs with lyrics by Gus Kahn
1937 songs